Taneli Kaleva Kekkonen (4 September 1928 – 11 July 1985) was a Finnish diplomat and one of the twin sons of president Urho Kekkonen and author Sylvi Kekkonen.

In 1952, he married K.A. Fagerholm's daughter Brita Fagerholm (1927–2013) and had two children, Timo (born 1957) and Tea (born 1963).

Taneli Kekkonen was a Bachelor of Political Science and worked at the Ministry of Foreign Affairs since 1952. Kekkonen served as Ambassador in Belgrade, Athens, Rome from 1975 to 1980, Malta, Warsaw from 1980 to 1984 and finally in Tel Aviv from 1984 to 1985.

When Kekkonen was caught drunk driving in the early 1980s, the Foreign Ministry invited him home from Tel Aviv. Kekkonen was deeply depressed and told his wife Brita that he was going to commit suicide. His wife asked him to wait for at least a year. That year, Kekkonen sat in his office at the Ministry of Foreign Affairs during office hours and no assignments were assigned to him. On 11 July 1985, Kekkonen committed suicide by hanging.

References

1928 births
1985 deaths
1985 suicides
Suicides by hanging in Finland
Ambassadors of Finland to Yugoslavia
Ambassadors of Finland to Israel
Ambassadors of Finland to Greece
Diplomats from Helsinki
Ambassadors of Finland to Italy
Ambassadors of Finland to Malta
Ambassadors of Finland to Poland
Children of national leaders
Finnish twins